Rock Swings is an album by Paul Anka. Recorded in November 2004 and released on May 31, 2005 in Canada and June 7, 2005 in the United States, it contains swing jazz covers of popular rock and pop songs from the 1980s and 1990s.

The idea of an established vocalist giving rock hits a "standards" treatment was earlier realized by Anka's contemporary Pat Boone in the 1997 album, In a Metal Mood: No More Mr. Nice Guy, with Boone doing covers of songs by Alice Cooper, Van Halen and Judas Priest. That same year, Steve Lawrence and Eydie Gormé covered Soundgarden's "Black Hole Sun" in a lounge-jazz style on the 1997 compilation album release, Lounge-A-Palooza. Anka also covers "Black Hole Sun" on Rock Swings.

Reportedly, the Michael Jackson song "Billie Jean" was slated to be on the album in the recording stages, but Paul Anka could not get through a vocal take without bursting into laughter.  The album features "It's My Life" by Bon Jovi, a song which includes the line "Like Frankie said, 'I did it my way'", a tongue-in-cheek reference to the Sinatra classic "My Way", the lyrics to which were written by Anka.

After the release of this album, Anka was awarded a star on Canada's Walk of Fame in Toronto. A DVD release of the same name, including live performances of these songs by Anka, was released on December 6, 2005.

Charts
Debuted at:
 #120 on the Billboard 200
 #9 on the Official UK Album Chart
 #2 on Billboard's Top Jazz Albums chart
 #1 on Amazon.de

Track listing

Certifications

Samples

Personnel
 Paul Anka: Executive producer
 Alex Christensen: Production
 Al Schmitt: Engineering, mixing
 Jon Crosse:  Conductor
 Patrick Williams, Randy Kerber, John Clayton: Session arrangers and conductors

Musicians
 Paul Anka: Vocals
 Jon Bon Jovi: Guitar, Piano, Backing Vocals
 Randy Kerber: Piano on all tracks except 5, 8
 Mike Lang: Piano on tracks 5, 8
 Jon Crosse: Tenor Saxophone on track 12
 Vinnie Colaiuta: Drums
 Mike Valerio: Bass guitar
 Larry Koonse: Guitar on tracks 2, 3, 4, 6, 7, 9, 11, 12, 13, 14
 Dean Parks: Guitar on tracks 1, 5, 8, 10
 Emil Richards: Vibraphone
 Gary Grant (Lead), Charles Davis, Larry Hall: Trumpet
 Warren Luening: Trumpet on tracks 3, 4, 6, 7, 12, 13, 14
 Sal Cracchiolo: Trumpet on tracks 1, 2, 5, 8, 9, 10, 11
 Steve Holtman, Andrew Martin: Trombone
 Alex Iles, Bill Reichenbach: Trombone on tracks 3, 4, 6, 7, 12, 13, 14
 Bob McChesney, Bryant Byers: Trombone on tracks 1, 2, 5, 8, 9, 10, 11
 Gene Cipriano: Tenor Saxophone, Flute
 Dan Higgins, Greg Huckins: Alto Saxophone, Flute
 Bill Liston: Tenor Saxophone, Flute, Clarinet
 Joel Peskin: Bass Clarinet, Baritone Saxophone
 Joel Derouin (Concert-master): Violin on tracks 4, 6, 7, 11, 12, 14
 Rebecca Bunnell, Mario De Leon, Tiffany Yi Hu, Patricia Johnson, Peter Kent, Miran Kojian, Haim Shtrum, Mari Tsumura, Shari Zippert, Kirstin Fife, Razdan Kuyumjian, Dennis Molchan, Les Terry: Violin on tracks 4, 6, 7, 11, 12, 14
 Bruce Dukov (Concert-master): Violin on tracks 6 and 7
 Jennifer Munday, Anatoly Rosinsky, Charles Everett, Armen Garabedian, Berj Garabedian, Darius Campo: Violin on tracks 6 and 7
 Marilyn Baker, Jorge Moraga, James Ross, Harry Shirinian, Karie Prescott, Evan Wilson: Viola on tracks 4, 6, 7, 11, 12, 14
 Simon Oswell, Pam Goldsmith: Viola on tracks 6 and 7
 Larry Corbett, Vanessa Freebairn-Smith, Miguel Martinez, Steve Richards, Andrew Shulman, Anne Karam: Cello on tracks 4, 6, 7, 11, 12, 14
 Ernie Ehrhardt: Cello on tracks 6 and 7
 Peter Doubrovsky, Frances Liu-Wu: Bass guitar on track 14
 Gayle Levant: Harp on track 14
 Brad Warnaar, Jim Atkinson, Kurt Snyder: French Horn on track 14

See also
In a Metal Mood: No More Mr. Nice Guy (1997)
Lounge Against the Machine (2000)

References
 Verve Music information page
 Verve Music press release
 Billboard Bits: Paul Anka

Footnotes

External links
 Paul Anka Spins Pop His Way with 'Rock Swings on NPR's Morning Edition

2005 albums
Covers albums
Paul Anka albums
Verve Records albums